Sante Flora e Lucilla is a Roman Catholic parish church and former pieve in the comune of Santa Fiora, Province of Grosseto, region of Tuscany, Italy.

The first documentation of a church here dates to 1144. Above the stone portal is a Romanesque window. The interior has three naves and a wooden ceiling. The inside of the church has terra cotta decorations by Andrea della Robbia; these depict a Madonna della cintola, The Baptism of Jesus, a Last Supper and a triptych with a Coronation of the Virgin flanked by Saints Francis and Jerome.

References

Churches in the province of Grosseto
Romanesque architecture in Tuscany
12th-century Roman Catholic church buildings in Italy